Brian Cahill (22 November 1938 – 28 July 1999) was an  Australian rules footballer who played with North Melbourne in the Victorian Football League (VFL).

After leaving North Melbourne, Cahill joined Brunswick in the Victorian Football Association.

Notes

External links 

1938 births
1999 deaths
Australian rules footballers from Victoria (Australia)
North Melbourne Football Club players
Brunswick Football Club players